Thomas or Tom Hawkins may refer to:

Sir Thomas Hawkins (died 1640), 17th-century English poet and translator
Thomas Hawkins (pirate) (died 1690), English pirate active off America's New England coast
Thomas Hawkins (literary editor) (1729–1772), English Anglican priest and academic
Thomas Jarman Hawkins (1809–1885), Australian politician
Thomas R. Hawkins (1840–1870), American soldier
Thomas Hawkins (geologist) (1810–1889), English fossil collector
Thomas W. Hawkins Jr. (born 1938), American mathematician, recipient of the Chauvenet Prize in 1997
Thomas Fisher (MP) (died 1577), or Thomas Hawkins, English politician
Tom Hawkins (basketball) (1936–2017), American basketball player
Tom Hawkins (footballer, born 1988), Australian rules footballer for Geelong
Tom Hawkins (footballer, born 1885) (1885–1907), Australian rules footballer for South Melbourne
Tom Hawkins (writer) (1927–1988), Beat generation poet believed responsible for the "Wanda Tinasky" letter of the 1980s
Thomas Hawkins (priest) (1766–1850), Church of Ireland priest
Thomas Desmond Hawkins (1923–2015), dean of Cambridge University's school of clinical medicin